Abellan or Abellán is a surname. Notable people with the surname include:

Alejandro Abellan (born 1965), Canadian actor
Carmen Conde Abellán (1907–1996), Spanish poet, writer and literary critic
Cayetano Hilario Abellan (1916–1997), Spanish sculptor
Joan Abellan i Mula (born 1946), Spanish playwright and writer